Mbuyiseli "Russell" Madlanga (born 27 March 1962) is a judge of the Constitutional Court of South Africa, having been appointed on 1 August 2013.

Early life 
Madlanga was born in 1962 in Njijini village, Mount Frere, to a family of the amaBhaca. He attended Mariazell High School in Matatiele. His father, a teacher, encouraged him to apply for a bursary to read law at the University of Transkei, where he completed a BJuris in 1981 in an atmosphere of growing unrest. During his final year he began working in a magistrate's office, though he was close friends with African National Congress activists under investigation by his colleagues.

In 1985 he moved to Grahamstown, then in a state of "complete chaos", and completed an LLB at Rhodes University the following year. From 1987 to 1989 he worked as a law lecturer at the University of Transkei, teaching customary law, the law of delict and the law of contract. He won a scholarship to attend the University of Notre Dame and completed his LLM there in 1990. For the next six months he worked in the Washington, D.C. office of Amnesty International, where he briefly met Nelson Mandela after his release from prison.

Legal career 
In 1991, Madlanga returned to South Africa, now a much freer place, and began practice as an advocate in Mthatha. His admission to the Bar was moved by his close friend and mentor Tholie Madala; Sandile Ngcobo, with whom Madlanga would also later work at the Constitutional Court of South Africa, was a colleague and friend of both.

On 1 September 1996, Madlanga was appointed to the bench of the Transkei Division of the High Court (now the Mthatha seat of the Eastern Cape Division). He later became its acting Judge President. From 1998 to 1999, he was an acting judge on the Supreme Court of Appeal.

The following year he became an acting judge of the Constitutional Court upon Arthur Chaskalson's invitation. He was on the bench in Mohamed v President of the Republic of South Africa, which held that the South African government may not extradite a suspect who may face the death penalty unless it receives an assurance it will not be imposed; Prince v President, Cape Law Society, which upheld a law criminalising the use of marijuana, even for religious reasons; Carmichele v Minister of Safety and Security; Minister of Public Works v Kyalami Ridge Environmental Association; and S v Mamabolo. Madlanga authored S v Steyn, which declared unconstitutional provisions of the Criminal Procedure Act, 1977 that removed an accused person's automatic right of appeal against a magistrate's court conviction.

In 2001, Madlanga resigned from the bench, saying the salary was insufficient to support his family, and returned to private practice. He appeared for South Africa at the International Court of Justice in the case regarding the Israeli West Bank barrier. He also served as evidence leader at the commission of inquiry into the fitness of Bheki Cele to hold office as national police commissioner, and at the Farlam Commission investigating the Marikana miners' strike.

Constitutional Court appointment 
On 1 August 2013, Madlanga was appointed permanently to the Constitutional Court, replacing Zak Yacoob.  His appointment had been widely expected, especially after he impressed at his interview before the JSC (on which Madlanga had served since 2010), though some felt a woman ought to have been appointed. He was questioned on his 1998 judgment in Bangindawo v Head of the Nyanda Regional Authority, in which he had held controversially that there was "no reason whatsoever for the imposition of the western conception of the notions of judicial impartiality and independence in the African customary law setting". Madlanga admitted at the interview that this judgment was wrong.

Madlanga's first judgment for the Constitutional Court was Gaertner v Minister of Finance, on the right to privacy and search and seizure. In March 2014, he wrote a 94-paragraph judgment dismissing Uruguayan businessman Gaston Savoi's challenge to his prosecution on charges of corruptly procuring a contract from the KwaZulu-Natal government. A year later, Madlanga delivered the controversial main judgment in Paulsen v SlipKnot Investments 777 (Pty) Ltd, which removes an exception to the in duplum rule. This judgment was described as "consumer friendly", but marked a "sea change" for South African banking practice, and was strongly criticised extra-curially by Malcolm Wallis. Madlanga's next judgment for the Court was DE v RH, which abrogated the action for adultery. Madlanga was one of the authors of the majority judgment in the 2015 My Vote Counts v Speaker, National Assembly, which was widely condemned. The majority refused to hear an application by an NGO to compel Parliament to enact legislation requiring the disclosure of political parties' private funding.

Nomination to position of Chief Justice
Madlanga was included in the list of 8 nominations for the position of Chief Justice of the Republic by President Ramaphosa on 4 October 2021.

Personal life 
Madlanga's wife is Nkosisi Monica Madlanga (née Nkenkana). He has six children.

References

1962 births
Living people
People from Umzimvubu Local Municipality
Xhosa people
Judges of the Constitutional Court of South Africa
20th-century South African judges
Walter Sisulu University alumni
Rhodes University alumni
University of Notre Dame alumni
21st-century South African judges